Athiratha Maharatha is a 1987 Indian Kannada-language film,  directed by  Perala and produced by Bheemavarapu Bhucchi Reddy. The film stars Anant Nag, Tiger Prabhakar, Ambika and Sayad. The film has musical score by K. Chakravarthy. The movie is a remake of the Malayalam film Rajavinte Makan.

Cast

Anant Nag
Tiger Prabhakar
Ambika
Avinash
Balakrishna
Sathyajith Kannada Film Actor
Lokanath
Lohithaswa
Sundar Krishna Urs
Janardhan
Krishne Gowda
BEML Somanna
Seetharam
Nagesh Kampalapura
Brahmavar
Gopalakrishna
Nanjundaiah
Hanumanthachar
Shanthamma
Master Amith
Master Chethan
Vajramuni in Special appearance

Soundtrack
The music was composed by K. Chakravarthy.

References

External links
  
 

1987 films
1980s Kannada-language films
Films scored by K. Chakravarthy
Kannada remakes of Malayalam films